Aklan, officially the Province of Aklan (Akeanon: Probinsya it Akean [ak'ɣan];), is a province in the Western Visayas region of the Philippines. Its capital is Kalibo. The province is situated in the northwest portion of Panay Island, bordering Antique to the southwest, and Capiz to the southeast. Aklan faces the Sibuyan Sea and Romblon province to the north.

Aklan is most well-known for Boracay, a resort island 0.8 kilometer north of the tip of Panay. It is known for its white sand beaches and is considered one of the more prominent destinations in the country. The Ati-Atihan Festival of Kalibo has also been known worldwide, hence declared "The Mother of all Philippine Festivals." It is an annual celebration held on the third Sunday of January to honor the Sto. Niño (Infant Jesus). The festival showcases tribal dancing through the town's main streets to the tune of ethnic music, with participants in indigenous costumes and gear.

History

Aklan is believed to have been settled in the 13th century by settlers from Borneo, ruled by the chieftain Datu Dinagandan which traded with its neighbouring islands. Aklan then became a part of the Kedatuan of Madja-as.

Towards the end of the 13th century, Datu Dinagandan moved the capital from what is now Batan. In 1433, Datu Kalantiaw's grandson and successor, Datu Kalantiaw III, was said by Jose Marcos to have formulated a set of laws known today as the Code of Kalantiaw. Well-respected scholarly long-term Philippine resident historian William Henry Scott proved these "laws" to be a total fabrication.

In 1437, the short-lived dynasty of Datu Kalantiaw ended when Datu Kalantiaw III was killed in battle with the tribes of Datu Manduyog, the legitimate successor of Datu Dinagandan. When Datu Manduyog became the new chieftain, he moved the capital to Bakan (now known as Banga).

Several datus succeeded Datu Manduyog until the Spanish explorer Miguel López de Legazpi landed in Batan in 1565 and claimed the island for Spain, in early Spanish accounts it was called El Río de Aclán. Datu Kabanyag was the chieftain at that period and had his capital in Libacao.

In 1942, the Japanese invaded Aklan during World War II. In 1945, combined Filipino and American army along with Aklanon guerrillas liberated Aklan during the war in the Pacific.

Aklan (Akean) became an independent province through Republic Act No. 1414 signed by Philippine President Ramon Magsaysay on April 25, 1956, separating Aklan from Capiz. The original towns were Altavas, Balete, Batan, Banga, Buruanga, Ibajay, Kalibo, Lezo, Libacao, Madalag, Malay, Makato, Malinao, Nabas, New Washington, Numancia, and Tangalan, then all part of the province of Capiz. The province was inaugurated on November 8, 1956. Jose Raz Menez was appointed the first governor of Aklan by President Magsaysay and he served until December 30, 1959. In 1960, Godofredo P. Ramos became the first elected governor but upon resigning to run for Congress he was succeeded by the vice governor, Virgilio S. Patricio. In 1964, José B. Legaspi succeeded Patricio and he held office for two consecutive terms from 1964 to 1971.

Geography

Aklan occupies the northern third of the island of Panay and is bordered by the provinces of Capiz from the southeast and Antique from the southwest. It also faces the Sibuyan Sea from the north.

Located 6 km northwest of Mount Nausang and 4.8 km northeast of Mount Madja-as in Antique.

The province features high geographic diversity, ranging from white sandy beaches, mangroves and mountainous landscapes. Situated within the province is the river Akean, which appears unique due to its "boiling or frothing" appearance.

Administrative divisions
Aklan comprises 17 municipalities. The province is divided into two legislative districts for congressional representation.

Demographics

Ethnic groups
The main inhabitants of the province are the Aklanon, who are part of the Visayan ethnic group. Other inhabitants include the Negrito, locally known as the Ati and the Sulod, a lesser known tribal group living in the hinterlands of Panay. Other Visayans also present are the Hiligaynon, Karay-a, and Capiznon.

Languages
The most prominent languages in the province are Akeanon (Aklanon Proper), Malaynon, and Buruanganon. Akeanon is spoken by a majority of the people, while Malaynon is spoken in Malay and Buruanganon is spoken in Buruanga. Other regional languages used include Hiligaynon, Ati, Kinaray-a, and Capiznon. Tagalog and English are used in administration and business as the national official languages.

Religion

Roman Catholicism is the dominant religion of the people and Christian festivals such as Christmas and Lent are regarded with high importance. Meanwhile, Christian icons such as the Santo Niño are regarded as cultural symbols of the people. Animism, however, is still practised by the Ati. The Aglipayan Church or the Iglesia Filipina Independiente is the second most predominant religion in the province. Other religions in the province include Iglesia ni Cristo and Islam.

Economy

The province of Aklan is designated as a first class province.

Agriculture
Aklan depends on agriculture, with palay being the top produce in the province. Rice plantations had an area of  (0.39 percent of the total provincial agricultural area).

With the implementation of the Ginintuang Masaganang Ani (GMA) umaru rice production program using the Hybrid rice, production is expected to increase by 15 percent or an average of 10 metric tons per hectare in the succeeding years. However, the problem of low price support for rice still continues to affect the production sector.

In general, Aklan is sufficient in meat and other livestock and poultry products, though in the inventory of livestock and poultry in the year 2000, hog and chicken had a decrease in population from 114,890 heads of hogs and 886,597 heads of chickens in 1999 to 95,950 heads of hogs and 782,820 heads of chicken in the 2000. The decrease in production were attributed to the following factors: high cost of feeds, feed supplements and biologics; livestock and poultry diseases; increasing price of chicks; and, high cost of labor.

Coconut still occupies the largest area planted among major permanent agriculture crops. All the rest of the municipalities have areas below . However, in terms of copra production, Makato ranks number one with 2,770 metric tons per year; next is Balete with 2,669; and Libacao with 2,399. The rest produce less than 2000 metric tons. Total production is 25,375 metric tons annually.

Other crops produced include banana (Lakatan), mango, rambutan, and lanzones; and fiber crops such as piña fiber and abaca.

Aquaculture
Of the total fishpond areas,  are with Fishpond Lease Agreement (FLA);  are with permits;  are on process/application; and,  are titled.

Industry
Aklan is a top producer of abaca, which are dyed and made into cloths or place mats, bags, wall decors and fans.

The piña cloth, considered the "Queen of the Philippine Fabrics", is a prime produce of Kalibo, weaved from its unique crude wooden or bamboo handloom.

Lezo is known for its red clay, used by the natives to make pots, vases and various novelty items.

Government 
Elected Officials:
Member of the House of Representative:
Representative, 1st District of Aklan: Carlito S. Marquez
Representative, 2nd District of Aklan: Teodorico T. Haresco Jr.
Governor: Florencio T. Miraflores
Vice Governor: Reynaldo M. Quimpo
 Sangguniang Panlalawigan Members:

 1st District:
  Nemesio P. Neron
  Emmanuel Soviet Russia A. Dela Cruz
  Juris B. Sucro
  Harry C. Sucgang
  Immanuel L. Sodusta

2nd District:
  Jose Miguel M. Miraflores
  Jay E. Tejada
  Esel L. Flores
  Nelson T. Santamaria
  Ramon S. Gelito

PCL President (Philippine Councilors League): Teddy C. Tupas
ABC President (Association of Barangay Captains): Ciriaco T. Feliciano
SK Provincial Federation Chairman: Blessie D. Jizmundo

Transportation

Airports

It is known for its white sandy beaches and is considered one of the most prominent destinations in the Philippines. Because of this, there is frequent air travel to the province's airports in Kalibo and Caticlan. Kalibo International Airport is about ten minutes from the main plaza. Kalibo Airport serves direct flights to and from Taipei; Hong Kong; Shanghai and Beijing in China; Incheon, Busan, and Chengdu through international flights served by Air Asia Zest Airways, ANA, Jin Air, Tiger Air Philippines, Etihad Airlines and PAL Express, Cebu Pacific Air and Philippine Airlines.

The following are the airports in Aklan:
 Kalibo International Airport (under CAAP)
 Godofredo P. Ramos Airport (under public private partnership (PPP) with San Miguel Corporation)

Seaports
The following are the seaports in the province:

 Alegria Port
 Batan Port
 Cagban Port
 Caticlan Jetty Port
 Tabon Port
 Tambisaan Port
 Gibon Port
 Colong-Colong Port
 Dumaguit Port
 Kalibo Jetty Port
 New Washington Port

Culture
Despite the prevalence of Christianity, native beliefs about the aswang and the babaylan are still prevalent among the people. Kulam or witchcraft, locally known as amulit is still feared by many residents.

Cuisine
Two main dishes associated with Aklan and Aklanons are inubaran and binakol.

Inubaran, is a Filipino chicken stew or soup made with chicken cooked with diced banana pith, coconut milk (gata) or coconut cream (kakang gata), a souring agent, lemongrass, and various spices. The souring agent (called aeabihig) is traditionally either batuan fruits (Garcinia morella) or libas leaves (Spondias pinnata). The name means "[cooked] with ubad (banana pith)", not to be confused with ubod (palm heart); although ubod can sometimes be used as a substitute for ubad which can be difficult to acquire. Variants of the dish can also be made with other types of meat or seafood. It is a type of ginataan.

Binakol, also spelled binakoe, is a Filipino chicken soup made from chicken cooked in coconut water with grated coconut, green papaya (or chayote), leafy vegetables, garlic, onion, ginger, lemongrass, and patis (fish sauce). It can also be spiced with chilis. Binakol can also be cooked with other kinds of meat or seafood. It was traditionally cooked inside bamboo tubes or directly on halved coconut shells.

Linapay also known as tinamuk, is a dish related to Laing but from Aklan in the Western Visayas. It is made from pounded freshwater shrimp (ueang) mixed with gawud (grated young coconut meat) and wrapped with taro leaves (gutaw) and cooked in coconut milk.

Festivals
The province is known for its festivities which includes the Ati-Atihan festival in Kalibo. Originally, the festival was to celebrate the treaty between the Ati and the Malayan tribes who settled in the Island. The Ati live in the mountain regions and the Malay people in the flatlands or close to the water. The festivity begins on the dry season, at which time the Ati come down from the mountains to trade and celebrate with the Malayan tribes. When the Spaniards settled in the region and converted the Malays to their Christian religion, they asked the Malays to celebrate this festivity to coincide with the Feast of the Santo Niño (Holy Child) which is usually held during the third week of January.

Bariw Festival is a unique festival showcasing the skills of every Nabasnon in weaving bags, mats and hats made of bariw leaves – the prospering livelihood in the municipality. It is highlighted by the dance performance of local talent and ingenuity to the beat of the drums and indigenous rhythm celebrated every May 14 of the year.

Bugna Festival is a festival showcasing the different locally produced products and eco-tourism destinations of Tangalan like the marine sanctuary and coral garden, Afga Point, Campo Verde, Jawili Falls, Bughawi beach and reforestation project every May 16 of the year.

Kali-Ugyon Festival (kali stands for Kalipayan or happiness and Ugyon meaning "unity"). This is the festival celebrated in Libacao every December 30 to January 1, costumed in modern and indigenous outfits bringing people together on the streets for merry-making and to drive away evil spirits in the coming New Year.

Literature
Aklanons are known for their literature, which includes the epic of Kalantiao. Certain Aklanons, such as Melchor F. Cichon, Roman Aguirre, have produced several notable literary works in the province.

Ati – Atihan Festival 

The Ati-Atihan Festival is a feast held annually in honor of the Santo Niño (Infant Jesus), held on the third Sunday of January in the town of Kalibo, Aklan, Philippines, on the island of Panay. It originally came from Batan, Aklan, then adopted later by some neighboring towns. The name Ati-Atihan means "to be like Atis" or "to make believe Atis", the local name for the Aeta aborigines who first settled in Panay Island and other parts of the archipelago.

The festival consists of tribal dance, music, accompanied by indigenous costumes and weapons, and parade along the street. Christians and non-Christians observe this day with religious processions. It has inspired many other Philippine Festivals including the Sinulog Festival of Cebu and Dinagyang of Iloilo City, both adaptations of the Kalibo's Ati-Atihan Festival, and legally holds the title "The Mother of All Philippine Festivals", being the oldest festival in the Philippines and in spite of the other Sinulog and Dinagyang festivals' claims of the same title.

The costumes worn at the festival is patterned after the African tribal design like those seen at the Rio de Janeiro Carnaval in Brazil.

A 1200 A.D. event explains the origins of the festival. A group of 10 Malay chieftains called Datus, fleeing from the island of Borneo settled in the Philippines, and were granted settlement by the Ati people, the tribes of Panay Island. Datu Puti made a trade with the natives and bought the plains for a golden salakot, brass basins and bales of cloth. They gave a very long necklace to the wife of the Ati chieftain. Feasting and festivities followed soon after.

Some time later, the Ati people were struggling with famine as the result of a bad harvest. They were forced to descend from their mountain village into the settlement below, to seek the generosity of the people who now lived there. The Datus obliged and gave them food. In return, the Ati danced and sang for them, grateful for the gifts they had been given.

The festivity was originally a pagan festival from this tribe practicing Animism, and their worshiping their anito god. Spanish missionaries gradually added a Christian meaning. Today, the Ati-Atihan is celebrated as a religious festival.

In 2012, the National Commission for Culture and the Arts (NCCA) and the ICHCAP of UNESCO published Pinagmulan: Enumeration from the Philippine Inventory of Intangible Cultural Heritage. The first edition of the UNESCO-backed book included the Ati-atihan Festival, signifying its great importance to Philippine intangible cultural heritage. The local government of Aklan, in cooperation with the NCCA, was given the right to nominate the Ati-atihan Festival in the UNESCO Intangible Cultural Heritage Lists.

The people attend masses for the Santo Niño, and benefit dances sponsored by government organizations. The formal opening mass emphasizes the festival's religious event. The procession begins with a rhythmic drumbeats, and dances parading along the streets. The second day begins at dawn with a rosary procession, which ends with a community mass, and procession. The phrase "Hala Bira! Pwera Pasma!" is originally associated with the Sto. Nino Ati-Atihan Festival as the revelers and devotees keep on going with the festivities all over the town from morning to the wee hours of the next morning, rain or shine, for one week or even more. They believe that the miraculous Child Jesus will protect them from harm and illness. The highlight of the festival occurs on the third Saturday of January, when groups representing different tribes compete for tourists' attention and prizes. The festival ends with a procession of thousands of people carrying torches and different kinds of images of the Santo Niño on the third Sunday. The contest winners are announced at a masquerade ball which officially ends the festival.

Universities and colleges

Aklan is the home of the Regional Science High School for Region VI (RSHS-VI), one of the specialized system of public secondary schools in the Philippines.

 Aklan Catholic College — Andagao
 Aklan Catholic College — Kalibo Poblacion
 Aklan Polytechnic College — Kalibo
 Aklan Polytechnic College — New Washington
 Aklan State University — Banga (Main)
 Aklan State University — Ibajay
 Aklan State University — Kalibo
 Aklan State University — Makato
 Aklan State University — New Washington
 Altavas Colleges
 Balete Community College
 Batan Community College
 Canadian Tourism & Hospitality Institute — Boracay
 Carillo Culinary Arts and Skills Development Center
 Central Panay College of Science and Technology
 FEATI University — Kalibo
 Garcia College of Technology-Annex
 Garcia College of Technology-Capitol Site
 Madyaas Institute
 Numancia Integrated School (NIS)
 JAVTES College — Kalibo
 Lezo Technical College
 Montfort Technical Institute
 New OFW Vocational and Technical School
 Northwestern Visayan Colleges
 Numancia National School of Fisheries
 Panay Technological College
 Provincial Academic Center College of Nursing
 Saint Gabriel College
 Saint Anne Business School
 STI College of Kalibo
 Santo Niño Seminary
 Verde Grande Culinary School
 Western Pacific College

Flora and Fauna

Several species endemic to the Philippines are found in the province. Examples include endangered animals such the Philippine spotted deer (Cervus alfredi), the Visayan warty pig (Sus cebifrons), and the Visayan hornbill (Penelopides panini). As of 2007, conservation efforts are being made by the Aklan State University and the DENR with varying success. Three mangrove species are in the World's Red List namely Avicennia rumphiana (Vulnerable), Ceriops decandra (Nearly Threatened) and Camptostemon philippinense (Endangered) are documented in the forest of Ibajay, Aklan.

See also
 Penitent Sisters of Our Lady of Fatima
 Roman Catholic Diocese of Kalibo
 Code of Kalantiaw

References

External links

 
 
 
 The Official Website of the Provincial Government of Aklan 
 The Official Website of Kalibo Ati-atihan Festival
 ABS-CBN Choose Philippines travel guide to Aklan 

 
Provinces of the Philippines
Provinces of Western Visayas
States and territories established in 1956
1956 establishments in the Philippines